Riccardo Cerutti (7 September 1921 – 7 July 1999) was an Italian rower. He competed at the 1948 Summer Olympics in London with the men's coxed four where they were eliminated in the semi-final. Cerutti died in Lovere on 7 July 1999, at the age of 77.

References

1921 births
1999 deaths
European Rowing Championships medalists
Italian male rowers
Olympic rowers of Italy
Rowers at the 1948 Summer Olympics
Sportspeople from the Province of Bergamo
20th-century Italian people